Charles Wykeham-Martin DL (11 September 1801 – 30 October 1870) was an English Conservative Party politician who sat in the House of Commons in three periods between 1841 and 1870.

Martin was born Charles Wykeham the son of Fiennes Wykeham of Leeds Castle Maidstone and his wife Eliza Bignell, daughter of R. Bignell. He was educated at Eton College and at Balliol College, Oxford. In 1821 his father assumed the additional name of Martin. He was a Fellow of the Royal Society of Antiquaries, a corresponding member of the Academy d'Archeologie de Belgique, and a Fellow of the Royal Statistical Society. He was also a lieutenant-colonel of the 3rd Battalion Kent Volunteers and a Deputy Lieutenant and J.P. for Kent and a J.P. for Hampshire.

Martin stood for parliament unsuccessfully at Newport (Isle of Wight) in 1837 but was elected Member of Parliament (MP) for Newport in 1841. He lost the seat at Newport in 1852 and stood unsuccessfully at Maidstone in 1853. He was elected MP for West Kent at a by-election in 1857 as a Liberal but lost the seat in 1859. At the 1865 general election he was elected MP for Newport again and re-elected in 1868 when representation was reduced to one member. He held the seat until his death in 1870.

Martin died at the age of 69 at Leeds Castle on 30 October 1870.

Martin married firstly in 1828, Lady Jemima Isabella Cornwallis, daughter of James Mann, 5th Earl Cornwallis. She died in 1836 and he married secondly in 1838, Matilda Trollope daughter of Sir John Trollope, 6th Baronet. His son Philip was MP for Rochester. His second son Fiennes took the surname Cornwallis in 1859 by Royal licence in accordance with an inheritance from Caroline Cornwallis.

Charles Wykeham Martin is the grandfather of Fiennes Cornwallis, 1st Baron Cornwallis, the great-grandfather of Wykeham Cornwallis, 2nd Baron Cornwallis, and the great-great grandfather of Fiennes Neil Wykeham Cornwallis, 3rd Baron Cornwallis.

Works

References

External links

1801 births
1870 deaths
Liberal Party (UK) MPs for English constituencies
UK MPs 1868–1874
UK MPs 1841–1847
UK MPs 1847–1852
UK MPs 1857–1859
UK MPs 1865–1868
People educated at Eton College
Alumni of Balliol College, Oxford
Deputy Lieutenants of Kent
People from Leeds, Kent
Members of Parliament for Newport (Isle of Wight)